Stensved is a town, with a population of 1,585 (1. January 2022), situated on the southern Zealand (Region Sjælland), in Denmark. It is a satellite town to Vordingborg. The town is a part of Vordingborg Municipality. Stensved was inhabited already in the Iron Age, which stretched from 1200 BC to 1 BC.

Community 
Kulsbjerg Skole, is a middleschool located in Stensved, which is named after the peak "Kulsbjerg", situated 5 km northeast from Stensved. Kulsbjerg is the highest point of the southern Zealand, reaching up 107m.

Stores 
Even though Stensved is a small town, a lot of stores are able to survive in the small community. 
There are both a Netto and a Rema 1000 in Stensved. 
There are 2 pizzerias, Siesta & Stensved Pizza and Grill. 
There are two barbers, Salon Engelhardt & Frisør Stuen.
There is butcher and several autoshops as well.

References 

Cities and towns in Region Zealand
Vordingborg Municipality